Pseuduvaria calliura is a species of plant in the family Annonaceae.  It is endemic to Borneo. Herbert Kenneth Airy Shaw, the English botanist who first formally described the species, named it after the long, beautiful tails, or tips, of its leaves.

Description
It is a tree reaching 10 meters in height. Its branches have sparse lenticels. Its mildly leathery leaves are 15.5-19 by 4.5-6.5 centimeters.  The tips of the leaves come to a distinctive 35-50 millimeter long point.  The leaves are hairless on their upper surface and densely hairy on their lower surface. The leaves have 12-16 pairs of secondary veins emanating from their midribs. Its densely hairy petioles are 4-8 millimeters long with a groove on their upper side. Inflorescences are organized on short, inconspicuous peduncles. Each inflorescence has 1 flower. Each flower is on a densely hairy pedicel 4-8 millimeters in length. The flowers unisexual. Its flowers have 3 sepals, 0.7-1 by 1-1.5 millimeters, that are partially fused at their base. The sepals are smooth on their upper surface, sparsely hairy on their lower surface, and have fine hairs on their margins. Its 6 petals are arranged in two rows of 3. The outer oval-shaped petals are 1.5 by 1.5-2 millimeters with smooth upper surfaces and sparsely hairy lower surfaces. The inner petals have a 2 millimeter long claw at their base and a 3.5-4 by 2.5-3 millimeter blade.  The inner petals are sparsely hairy on their upper surface and densely hairy on their lower surface.  Each inner petal has a horizontal, rod-shaped gland at the base of its outer surface. Male flowers have up to 24 stamens that are 0.6-0.7 millimeters long. Fruit are on sparsely hairy pedicels 7-12 millimeters in length. The fruit consists of up to 7 monocarps.  Each mature monocarp is a 9-13 by 10 millimeter globe. The mature monocarps are green, wrinkly and hairy.

Reproductive biology
The pollen of P. calliura is shed as permanent tetrads.

References

External links
 

Flora of Borneo
calliura
Taxa named by Herbert Kenneth Airy Shaw